Hellblazers is a 2022 American action horror film directed by Justin Lee and starring Bruce Dern, Billy Zane, Tony Todd and Adrienne Barbeau.

Cast
Bruce Dern as Bill Unger
Billy Zane as Joshua
Tony Todd as Harry
Adrienne Barbeau as Georgia
John Kassir as Rick
Meg Foster as Mary
Courtney Gains as Bernard
Danielle Gross as Deanna
Crash Buist as Teddy
Ed Morrone as Joe Anderson
Paige Sturges as Liz

Production
Filming occurred in California and wrapped in February 2020.

Release
The film was released on Tubi on January 21, 2022.

References

External links
 

2022 films
American action horror films
Films shot in California
2022 action films
2022 horror films
Tubi original programming
2020s English-language films
2020s American films